Fun with Dick and Jane is a 2005 American black comedy film directed by Dean Parisot and written by Judd Apatow and Nicholas Stoller. It stars Jim Carrey and Téa Leoni and is a remake of the 1977 film of the same name. The story focuses on a married, middle-class couple who resort to robbery when the husband's employer goes bankrupt. Alec Baldwin, Richard Jenkins, Angie Harmon, John Michael Higgins, Richard Burgi, Carlos Jacott, Gloria Garayua and Stephnie Weir also star, and James Whitmore appears in an uncredited cameo in one of his final roles. Fun with Dick and Jane was released by Sony Pictures Releasing label to Columbia Pictures on December 21, 2005 and grossed over $204 million worldwide at the box office. It was the third collaboration between Carrey and producer Brian Grazer, after Liar Liar and How the Grinch Stole Christmas.

Plot 
In 2000, Dick Harper gets promoted to Vice President of Communications for the major media corporation Globodyne. He convinces his wife Jane to quit her job as a travel agent to spend more time with their son Billy, as Dick's salary would be able to cover their expenses.

However, during an interview on television on his first day, he discovers his CEO covertly sold 80 percent of his shares in the company and Globodyne is accused of "perverting the American dream" by presidential candidate Ralph Nader. Simultaneously, all of the company's stocks drop to zero, and everyone, including Dick, lose their jobs, savings, and pensions. Dick tries to confront CEO Jack McCallister, but he flies away in the company's helicopter.
 
Breaking the news to his family that night, Dick tries to assure them he can find another job as vice president. However, he soon finds that Globodyne's collapse has sent the overall economy into a recession, making it next to impossible to find a new vice president position. In addition, the television interview has tarnished his reputation as being incompetent, rendering him not hirable. Even worse, Jane discovers that, because their pension and all their savings and investments were tied up in Globodyne's now-worthless stock, the family now has no assets and face possibly losing their home.

Dick and Jane then accept low paying work, but are unable to keep their jobs. Soon afterwards, their utilities are cut off, forcing them to sell their personal property and take off-the-books work to stay afloat; the latter results in Dick getting wrongfully arrested and deported, necessitating his 'illegal' re-entry. When given a 24-hour eviction notice, a wearied Dick turns to crime, persuading Jane to follow him. After a few mishaps, they rob a head shop. They go on to have a few nightly robbing sprees, becoming more comfortable and professional, even stealing from people who wronged them during their job search, and eventually retire their entire debt. For their final heist, they come up with a complex scheme to steal from a local bank. All goes as planned until the Petersons – another Globodyne couple – make an amateurish attempt to rob the same bank. The Petersons are quickly arrested and Dick and Jane lose their chance to rob the place, but take advantage of the hysteria to escape.

Watching a news report on the arrests of the Petersons and other former Globodyne employees who desperately turned to crime, the Harpers decide to cease their criminal lifestyle. However, Dick finds that his interview with Ralph Nader has caused him to be indicted for his unwitting role in the company's collapse. Drowning his sorrows at a millionaire's club, he stumbles upon drunk former CFO of the company, Frank Bascombe. When he and Jane confront him, Frank remorsefully admits Jack had planned everything from the beginning: during Dick's television interview, Jack diverted all of Globodyne's assets and then dumped the entire stock, thus ruining the company and its employees and investors, and leaving Dick and Frank to take the blame, while embezzling a $400 million fortune and getting off scot-free. Frank, about to go to prison for 18 months for his role in the scheme after failing to expose Jack's crimes, got $10 million in hush money from him.

Frank tells him Jack plans to transfer the $400 million to an offshore account and creates a plan with Dick and Jane to intercept the transfer, rerouting the funds to an account Frank has established. Things go wrong when Dick accidentally loses the form, so they must print a new one in the bank while Jack is there making the transfer. Jack realizes there are errors on the form and spots Dick. Finally, Dick holds Jack discreetly at gunpoint, demanding he sign a check, which he does. Dick reveals to Jane it was a ruse to get his signature, so Jane, an art major, can forge it.

The next day, Jack is mobbed by reporters and former Globodyne employees, all praising him for his sudden "generosity". Dick shows up as vice president and hands him a prepared statement, which the CEO reads on live television. He is shocked to announce he has transferred $400 million to a trust fund to support Globodyne's defunct pension plan. A news report reveals the company's former employees (including the now-imprisoned Petersons) will get their pension checks from the fund, Dick's reputation is restored and he evades indictment, and Jack's net worth has been reduced to a mere $2,238.04.

Some time later, Dick's family drives a Volkswagen Rabbit convertible into the sunset. While Billy is teaching his parents Spanish, Dick's friend Garth drives up in a brand new Bentley Azure, excited to reveal that he has a new job with great benefits, at Enron.

Cast

Background
The film is based on a "story" (which may have been a screenstory or a screenplay that was rejected but whose basic idea was retained) by Gerald Gaiser which was previously filmed in 1977. (Some sources erroneously claim the source to be a novel by Gaiser, but there is only a novelization by Linda Stewart as "Sam Stewart"; the book solely cites "a screenplay by Gerald Gaiser" as its source, but is clearly based on a draft of the subsequent '77 shooting script, which was credited to David Giler, Jerry Belson and Mordecai Richler.) Peter Tolan wrote the first draft of the remake screenplay. In June 2003 it was announced that Jim Carrey would star in the film with Barry Sonnenfeld directing and Brian Grazer producing. On July 14, 2003 it was announced that Cameron Diaz would star opposite Carrey. The same day it was also reported that the Coen brothers would rewrite the script. On July 3 it was announced that Sonnenfeld had left the film six weeks before the start of production. Production was postponed until after Carrey had completed his next film Lemony Snicket's A Series of Unfortunate Events. On October it was announced that
Dean Parisot would replace Sonnenfeld as director and that production would start in June 2004. Judd Apatow and Nicholas Stoller worked on the script with Parisot. Diaz then left the film. On July 21, 2004, it was announced that she would be replaced by Téa Leoni.

Production
The film had more than two weeks of reshoots and numerous rewrites. David Koepp, Ed Solomon, Ted Griffin and the team of Alec Berg, David Mandel and Jeff Schaffer all did uncredited rewrites.

Reception

Critical reaction
On Rotten Tomatoes, Fun With Dick and Jane has an approval rating of 28% based on 135 reviews, with an average rating of 4.9/10. The site's critical consensus reads, "This muddled comedy has a few laughs, but never sustains a consistent tone." On Metacritic, the film has a score of 47 out of 100, based on 33 critics, indicating "mixed or average reviews". Audiences polled by CinemaScore gave the film an average grade of "B" on an A+ to F scale.

Justin Chang of Variety positively described the film as "the rare Hollywood remake that, by daring to reinterpret its source material within a fresh political context, actually has a reason to exist". Manohla Dargis of the New York Times commented that "... the film never settles into a groove, zigging and zagging from belly laughs to pathos ..."
Roger Ebert of the Chicago Sun-Times wrote: "Recycles the 1977 comedy right down to repeating the same mistakes." Ebert was critical of the film's unexplored opportunities and wrote that it instead turns to "tired slapstick". He suggested viewers might watch The New Age instead, which he described  as a superior film exploring a similar theme.

Box office
The film grossed $14 million on its opening weekend in third place when competing with King Kong and The Chronicles of Narnia: The Lion, the Witch and the Wardrobe during the holiday season. It eventually earned $110,332,737 at the domestic box office, and $91,693,375 in international receipts, for a total, worldwide revenue of $202,026,112, against a production budget of $100 million. It is one of twenty feature films to be released in over 3,000 theaters and improve on its box office performance in its second weekend, increasing 14.9% from $14,383,515 to $16,522,532. The high earnings despite the criticism were partially attributed to the scheduled trial of Kenneth Lay and Jeffrey Skilling, and the film credited corporate scandals for inspiration.

Soundtrack
The score by Theodore Shapiro written for the film was released on January 24, 2006.

Other songs
The following songs are featured in the film, but are not included on the soundtrack:

 "I Believe I Can Fly" - R. Kelly
 "Smooth Operator" - Sade
 "Right Place Wrong Time" - Dr. John
 "What I Got" - Sublime
 "Sandstorm" - Darude
 "Why Me Lord" - Johnny Cash
 "Wedding" - Randy Newman
 "Time Bomb" - Rancid
 "Uncontrollable Urge" - Devo
 "Insane in the Brain" - Cypress Hill
 "Alive & Amplified" - The Mooney Suzuki
 "The Best Things in Life Are Free" - Sam Cooke

References

External links
 
 
 
 
 

2005 films
Remakes of American films
2000s crime comedy films
American heist films
2000s English-language films
Films produced by Brian Grazer
American films about revenge
Films directed by Dean Parisot
Films set in California
Films set in 2000
Films set in 2001
Columbia Pictures films
American business films
American crime comedy films
Imagine Entertainment films
Films with screenplays by Judd Apatow
Films with screenplays by Nicholas Stoller
Films about fraud
Films scored by Theodore Shapiro
2000s heist films
2005 comedy films
Cultural depictions of George W. Bush
2000s American films